Éamon O'Donohoe (born 14 September 1937) is an Irish equestrian. He competed in two events at the 1960 Summer Olympics.

References

1937 births
Living people
Irish male equestrians
Olympic equestrians of Ireland
Equestrians at the 1960 Summer Olympics
Sportspeople from Galway (city)